This is a list of public art in and around Strand, a thoroughfare in the City of Westminster, London.

Strand has linked Westminster with the City of London since the time of the Anglo-Saxons. Aldwych is a crescent at its eastern end created during urban improvements in the early 20th century. Among the examples of architectural sculpture in this area, Jacob Epstein's reliefs of the Ages of Man for Zimbabwe House (originally the British Medical Association building) are of particular note. These were the sculptor's first major works in Britain and the subject of heated controversy due to the figures' nudity in a public setting.

On the campus of the London School of Economics, much of the public art was bequeathed to the university in 2005 by Louis Odette, a Canadian alumnus who also founded the Windsor Sculpture Park in Windsor, Ontario. He bequeathed a total of 13 works, mainly by Canadian sculptors, to the institution. Not all of those works are within the remit of this list, as some are situated indoors or in the adjacent borough of Camden.

References

Bibliography

 

 

 

 

 

Strand